Yakshivanovo (Yaqşiwan) is a rural locality (a village) in Krasnoyarsky Selsoviet, Ufimsky District, Bashkortostan, Russia. The population was 32 as of 2010. There is 1 street.

Geography 
Yakshivanovo is located 33 km north of Ufa (the district's administrative centre) by road. Kumlekul is the nearest rural locality.

References 

Rural localities in Ufimsky District